Iris is a 1901 play by the British writer Arthur Wing Pinero.

Film adaptation
In 1916 it was turned into a film Iris directed by Cecil M. Hepworth and starring Alma Taylor, one of the leading stars of the era.

References

Bibliography
 Goble, Alan. The Complete Index to Literary Sources in Film. Walter de Gruyter, 1999.

1901 plays
British plays adapted into films
Plays by Arthur Wing Pinero
West End plays